Thorstad is a Nordic surname. Notable people with the surname include:

David Thorstad (1941–2021), American political activist 
Torill Thorstad Hauger (1943–2014), Norwegian non-fiction writer and illustrator

Surnames of Scandinavian origin